Maracas Bay is a bay with sandy beach on the island of Trinidad.

It is located on the north side of the island, an hour's mountainous drive from the capital city of Port of Spain via the North Coast Road.

Unlike many of the northern beaches of Trinidad, Maracas Bay is protected by a deep bay. It is one of the most well known beaches in the island of Trinidad as it is considered by some to be the most beautiful beach of its size located relatively close to the capital city.

Beaches of Trinidad and Tobago
Trinidad (island)